Pirganj Upazila may refer to:

Pirganj Upazila, Rangpur
Pirganj Upazila, Thakurgaon